Morning Joy, subtitled Live at Sunset Paris  is a live album by saxophonist Steve Lacy which was recorded in France in 1986 and first released on the hat ART label in 1989. The album was reissued in 2001 as Morning Joy and 2015 as Morning Joy...Paris Live with an additional track.

Reception

The Allmusic review by Steve Loewy called it a "glorious set of pieces performed live in the mid-'80s by one of Steve Lacy's sterling working groups" stating "Morning Joy may not break any new ground, but it should provide considerable listening pleasure, both for those already familiar with the miraculous world of Steve Lacy and for those who are entering it for the first time".

Track listing
All compositions by Steve Lacy except where noted
 "Epistrophy" (Thelonious Monk, Kenny Clarke) – 9:20
 "Prospectus" – 7:44
 "Wickets" – 16:11
 "Morning Joy" – 10:25	
 "Work" (Monk) – 7:38 Additional track on CD reissue
 "In Walked Bud" (Monk) – 11:41
 "As Usual" – 13:11

Personnel
Steve Lacy – soprano saxophone
Steve Potts – alto saxophone, soprano saxophone
Jean-Jacques Avenel – bass
Oliver Johnson - drums

References

Steve Lacy (saxophonist) live albums
1989 live albums
Hathut Records live albums